Alan Baker  (19 August 1939 – 4 February 2018) was an English mathematician, known for his work on effective methods in number theory, in particular those arising from transcendental number theory.

Life
Alan Baker was born in London on 19 August 1939. He attended Stratford Grammar School, East London, and his academic career started as a student of Harold Davenport, at University College London and later at Trinity College, Cambridge, where he received his PhD. He was a visiting scholar at the Institute for Advanced Study in 1970 when he was awarded the Fields Medal at the age of 31. In 1974 he was appointed Professor of Pure Mathematics at Cambridge University, a position he held until 2006 when he became an Emeritus. He was a fellow of Trinity College from 1964 until his death.

His interests were in number theory, transcendence, linear forms in logarithms, effective methods, Diophantine geometry and Diophantine analysis.

In 2012 he became a fellow of the American Mathematical Society. He has also been made a foreign fellow of the National Academy of Sciences, India.

Research
Baker generalised the Gelfond–Schneider theorem, itself a solution to Hilbert's seventh problem. Specifically, Baker showed that if  are algebraic numbers (besides 0 or 1), and if  are irrational algebraic numbers such that the set  is linearly independent over the rational numbers, then the number  is transcendental.

Baker made significant contributions to several areas in number theory, such as the Gauss class number problem, diophantine approximation, and to Diophantine equations such as the Mordell curve.

Selected publications

;

Honours and awards
1970: Fields Medal
1972: Adams Prize
1973: Fellowship of the Royal Society

References

External links
 
 
 

1939 births
2018 deaths
20th-century English mathematicians
21st-century English mathematicians
Fields Medalists
Number theorists
Alumni of University College London
Alumni of Trinity College, Cambridge
Fellows of Trinity College, Cambridge
Fellows of the American Mathematical Society
Fellows of the Royal Society
Foreign Fellows of the Indian National Science Academy
Institute for Advanced Study visiting scholars
Cambridge mathematicians
Mathematicians from London